The Wild Geese Trophy is a hurling competition which was first played in 2018 at the Spotless Stadium in Sydney.

The 2018 contest was between 2018 Allianz Hurling League Division 1 Champions Kilkenny and 2017 All-Ireland Hurling Championship winners Galway, in what was the first ever full-format game of hurling to take place outside of Ireland.

2018
Galway won the first ever Wild Geese trophy after overcoming Kilkenny following a free-taking competition after the game finished in a draw in the Spotless Stadium in Sydney. Galway had trailed by 14 points towards the end of the first half.	
Joe Canning was shown a straight red card for a high tackle on Enda Morrissey after 54 minutes.	
	

decided by free-taking contest

References

2018 in hurling
History of hurling
Hurling in Australia
Senior inter-county hurling competitions